Konaklı (Laz language: Kordelit) is a village in the Arhavi District, Artvin Province, Turkey. Its population is 242 (2021).

References

Villages in Arhavi District
Laz settlements in Turkey